Fahrudin Melić (born 22 July 1984) is a Montenegrin handballer who currently plays for RK Nexe and the Montenegrin national team.

References

1984 births
Living people
Montenegrin male handball players
People from Prijepolje
Expatriate handball players
Montenegrin expatriate sportspeople in France